Heterotheca pumila, the alpine goldenaster, is a North American species of flowering plant in the family Asteraceae. It grows in alpine and subalpine regions in the mountains of the western United States. It has been found the Rocky Mountains in Wyoming, Colorado, Utah, and New Mexico.

References

pumila
Flora of the Western United States
Plants described in 1894
Flora without expected TNC conservation status